"24 Views of Mt. Fuji, by Hokusai " is a science fiction novella by American writer Roger Zelazny, originally published in the July 1985 issue of the Isaac Asimov's Science Fiction Magazine. It won the Hugo Award for Best Novella in 1986 and was also nominated for the Nebula Award for Best Novella in 1985.

The novella was partly inspired by Hokusai’s Views of Mt. Fuji (Charles Tuttle, 1965), a book that contains precisely 24 prints painted by Hokusai. In Zelazny's version, the character Mari consults that very book during the story. (Hokusai painted more than 100 images of Mt. Fuji but he is best known for another selection of them: Thirty-six Views of Mount Fuji.)

Plot summary
A widow makes a pilgrimage in Japan to some of the locations of Hokusai's views of Mt. Fuji, ultimately attempting to confront her former husband who had become a nearly all-powerful digital being.

External links

1985 American novels
American novellas
American science fiction novels
Works originally published in Asimov's Science Fiction
Hugo Award for Best Novella winning works
Mount Fuji
Novels set in Japan
Japan in non-Japanese culture